Karpatiosorbus badensis is a species of plant in the family Rosaceae. It is endemic to Germany.

References

External links

Flora of Germany
badensis
Vulnerable plants
Endemic flora of Germany
Taxonomy articles created by Polbot
Taxobox binomials not recognized by IUCN